Elbeuf-en-Bray (literally Elbeuf in Bray) is a commune in the Seine-Maritime department in the Normandy region in northern France.

Geography

Population

Places of interest
 A stone cross from the seventeenth century.
 A chateau built in 1504.
 A nineteenth-century chateau.
 The church of St.Pierre, dating from the twelfth century.

See also
Communes of the Seine-Maritime department

References

Communes of Seine-Maritime